The 1993–94 Romanian Hockey League season was the 64th season of the Romanian Hockey League. Five teams participated in the league, and Steaua Bucuresti won the championship.

Regular season

External links 
 Season on hockeyarchives.info

Romanian Hockey League seasons
Romanian
Rom